The Autonomous University of Ciudad Juárez, Universidad Autónoma de Ciudad Juárez (UACJ), is the largest university in the city of Ciudad Juárez, Chihuahua, Mexico, founded in October 1973.

History 

The UACJ was founded in 1973 by the integration of three universities, the Universidad Femenina, the Universidad Mixta, the Universidad Ciudad Juárez A.C., and the Universidad Autonoma de Ciudad Juarez. In the beginning, the Universidad Femenina was founded in 1968 with the enrollment of females only. The sub-professional careers offered in this institution were: social work, decoration, bilingual medical secretary, and Technical Assistant in Advertising. Later in the Universidad de Ciudad Juárez, the professional careers of law, architecture, and medicine were offered too. On January 29, 1973, the then president of Mexico, Luis Echeverría Álvarez laid the foundation stone of the Autonomous University of Ciudad Juarez. While doing this the president said: “We are laying here the foundation stone, so the national planning department can determine the sites and lands where the University must be built. In hopes of seeing a fully operational university in a few months”. President Echeverria promised to return before the end of the year to inaugurate the university, “Today I go back to Mexico City and I will arrange a reproduction of the car in which the president arrived in El Paso del Norte, it will be made at the same time, so it can be ready to be placed at the entrance door of the University, as a symbol of Mexico’s Independence”. He said. Nowadays, UACJ is formed by four institutes and three multidisciplinary divisions within the Chihuahua state.

Identity 

Elements of the emblem

The book: In the university's emblem, the book represents knowledge, study, and science.

The snail: represents the three institutes composing the university. The social sciences and administration institute, biomedical sciences institute, and engineering and architecture institute.

The flower or xochitl: stands for the presence of each one of the three universities that conformed the current UACJ.

The university's motto can be read inside the book, Por una vida científica, por una ciencia vital. Which means “For a scientific life, for a vital science”.

The graphic style of the ideogram is given by the pictorial and educational tradition of the ancient Mexicans.

The glyph: In Náhuatl called the cuicatl. Which means singing, prayer or word. Represents the university's voice projected towards people.

The calmecar. Represents the house of wisdom.

See also
Gimnasio Universitario UACJ

References

External links
 Universidad Autónoma de Ciudad Juárez 

Ciudad Juárez
Universidad Autónoma de Ciudad Juárez
Educational institutions established in 1973
1973 establishments in Mexico